Odunayo is a given name. Notable people with the name include:

 Odunayo Adekuoroye (born 1993), Nigerian wrestler
 Odunayo Olagbaju (died 2001), Nigerian politician
 Odunayo Eweniyi, Nigerian business executive and activist